South Kuzbass GRES is a thermal power plant (GRES) in Kaltan, Kemerovo Oblast, Russia.

As of January 1, 2007 total electric power 554 MW, heating — 560 Gcal/h.

Currently is a part of Mechel.

GRES is located close to the local coal deposits, largest metallurgical power-consuming industries, mining complexes and the public service of the southern Kuzbass. Coal for the GRES arrives primary from Southern Kuzbass Coal Company, also owned by Mechel.

See also

 List of power stations in Russia

External links
 Official site of Southern Kuzbass GRES 

Power stations built in the Soviet Union
Coal-fired power stations in Russia
Buildings and structures in Kemerovo Oblast
Mechel